Opinion polling was carried out prior to the 2017 Chilean general elections.

President

Open-ended question

Question: "Who would you like to be the next president?" Full sample is shown, unless specified.

a Likely voter (52%).
b Likely voter (49%).

First round

Question: "Given the following list of candidates, who would you vote for?"

a Ballot-box vote. b Estimated.

Second round

Question: "If the following two candidates proceed to a runoff election, who would you vote for?"

a Ballot-box vote.

References

2017